The Apostolic Nunciature to Florence was an ecclesiastical office of the Catholic Church to the Republic of Florence, Italy and later the Grand Duchy of Tuscany. It was a diplomatic post of the Holy See, whose representative is called the Apostolic Nuncio with the rank of an ambassador. In 1533, the Republic of Florence was replaced by the Grand Duchy of Tuscany. The office ceased to exist in 1860 after the United Provinces of Central Italy, a client state of the Kingdom of Sardinia-Piedmont, annexed Tuscany in 1859 and then Tuscany was formally annexed to Sardinia in 1860, following a landslide referendum, in which 95% of voters approved.

References

Florence
Apostolic Nuncios to the Republic of Florence